"Siren of the Woods" is the second single released by Swedish symphonic metal band Therion.

Track listing
 "The Siren of the Woods" (Single Version)
 "Cults of the Shadow" (Edited Version)
 "Babylon"

The song "The Siren of the Woods" is written in the Akkadian language. The music was written by Jonas Mellberg and the lyrics by Christofer Johnsson.

Personnel
Christofer Johnsson - guitar, vocals, keyboards
Piotr Wawrzeniuk - drums, vocals
Lars Rosenberg - bass guitar
Jonas Mellberg - guitar, acoustic guitar, keyboards

Guest musicians
Dan Swanö - vocals
Anja Krenz - solo soprano
Axel Pätz - solo bass-baritone
Jan Peter Genkel - additional keyboards

Choirs
North German Radio Choir
Siren Choir

References

External links
 
 
 Information  about single at the official website

Therion (band) songs
1996 singles
1996 songs
Nuclear Blast Records singles